Climacocystis borealis is a species of poroid fungus in the family Fomitopsidaceae.

Taxonomy
First described in 1821 by Swedish mycologist Elias Magnus Fries, it has since acquired an extensive synonymy of alternate scientific names. Until 2014, it was the sole member of the Climacocystis, a genus circumscribed by Czech mycologists František Kotlaba and Zdeněk Pouzar in 1958, when the newly described Chinese species Climacocystis montana was added to the genus.

Ecology and distribution
Climacocystis borealis is both a saprophyte and a secondary pathogen that causes a heart rot in the roots and bole of host trees. It is widely distributed, and has been recorded from Asia, Europe, Oceania, and North America. In China, it is found in Shanxi, Guangdong, Sichuan, and Tibet. It is not edible by humans.

References

External links

Fomitopsidaceae
Fungi described in 1821
Fungi of Europe
Fungi of Asia
Fungi of North America
Fungi of Oceania
Inedible fungi
Taxa named by Elias Magnus Fries
Fungi without expected TNC conservation status